Sara Crowe is a Scottish film and stage actress who mainly plays comedy roles.

Biography

Career
After beginning her career on stage and in television, Crowe began to take film roles, including a part in Carry On Columbus and as the 'first bride' Laura in the comedy film Four Weddings and a Funeral. Her West End appearances include Private Lives, Twelfth Night, Hay Fever and The Constant Wife and, on tour, Acorn Antiques the Musical and Alan Ayckbourn's Absurd Person Singular.

She is a regular performer (and part of the original cast) of the touring play Seven Deadly Sins Four Deadly Sinners. She gained notice in the United Kingdom in a series of TV advertisements for Philadelphia cream cheese spread in the 1990s, playing a ditsy blonde secretary with Ann Bryson as her friend. With Bryson, she also formed the comedy duo Flaming Hamsters; they co-starred in the 1995 film The Steal and the sitcom Sometime Never.

She appeared in the 2010 British feature film version of Tony Hawks's best selling book, Round Ireland with a Fridge.  In 2012 she appeared in St. John's Night (1853) by Henrik Ibsen at London's Jermyn Street Theatre.

Crowe has starred as Queen Thistle and also as Mrs Witch in the television programme Ben and Holly's Little Kingdom. She briefly appeared in the BBC soap series EastEnders in 2013, playing the character of Sheila Morris. She played Sarah Arscott in the ghost story  Martin's Close for the BBC (2019).

Crowe is Patron of Guildford-based educational, cultural and social community hub, The Guildford Institute.

Writing

Crowe's first novel, Campari for Breakfast, was published by Doubleday in April 2014.  Her second novel Martini Henry was published in 2016 by Doubleday.

Personal life

Crowe was married to Toby Dale, the son of Jim Dale, from July 1992 until 1998. Since 2003, she has been married to Sean Carson.

Awards

1990
 Olivier Award for Best Supporting Actress
 Variety Club Best Actress Award
 London Critics Circle Theatre Award for Most Promising Newcomer (performance in Private Lives)
 Nominated for Olivier Award for Best Comedy Performance for Hay Fever

Filmography
 Home To Roost (1989) – Cherry Gibson
 Haggard (1990) – Fanny Foulacre
 Carry On Columbus (1992) – Fatima
 The Thief and the Cobbler (voice only; 1992 version, unreleased) – Princess YumYum (unfinished version) (voice)
 Four Weddings and a Funeral (1994) – Laura, the Bride – Wedding One
 The Steal (1995) – Bank Transfer Secretary
 Caught in the Act (1997) – Lucinda
 Round Ireland with a Fridge (2010) – Nicola

References

External links

1966 births
Living people
Laurence Olivier Award winners
People from Irvine, North Ayrshire
Scottish people of Australian descent
Scottish expatriates in Spain
Scottish film actresses
Scottish stage actresses
Scottish television actresses
Scottish women comedians
British comedy actresses